Thomas Stallworth III is a politician from Michigan. Stallworth was a Democratic member of the Michigan House of Representatives.

Early life 
Stallworth was born in Detroit, Michigan. Stallworth graduated from Mumford High School in Detroit.

Education
Stallworth earned a degree from Michigan State University.

Career 
On November 2, 2010, Stallworth won the election and became a Democratic member of Michigan House of Representatives for District 8. Stallworth defeated Keith Franklin with 97.45% of the votes.

On November 6, 2012, Stallworth won the election and became a Democratic member of Michigan House of Representatives for District 7. Stallworth defeated Mark Ashley Price with 97.98% of the votes.

Personal life 
Stallworth's wife is Nic Stallworth. They have four children. Stallworth and his family live in Detroit, Michigan.

See also 
 Jimmy Womack

References

External links 
 Thomas Stallworth III at ballotpedia.org

Living people
Democratic Party members of the Michigan House of Representatives
Year of birth missing (living people)
Michigan State University alumni